Maikal Chandra is an Indian politician and a member of the 16th Legislative Assembly of Uttar Pradesh of India. He represents the Dhanaura constituency of Uttar Pradesh and is a member of the Samajwadi Party.

Early life and education
Maikal Chandra was born in Dhanaura, Amroha, Uttar Pradesh. He holds Master of Arts degree. Chandra belongs to the scheduled caste community.

Political career
Maikal Chandra has been a MLA for one term. He represented the Dhanaura constituency and is a member of the Samajwadi Party.

Posts held

See also
Dhanaura
Politics of India
Sixteenth Legislative Assembly of Uttar Pradesh
Uttar Pradesh Legislative Assembly

References 

Samajwadi Party politicians
Uttar Pradesh MLAs 2012–2017
People from Amroha district
1945 births
Living people